"Of Mice and Men" is a 2004 song by American heavy metal band Megadeth, written by Dave Mustaine. It was the second single from their 2004 album The System Has Failed, which was released on September 14, 2004.

Charts

Personnel
 Dave Mustaine - guitars, lead vocals, lyrics

Studio session musicians
 Chris Poland - guitars
 Jimmie Lee Sloas - bass
 Vinnie Colaiuta - drums

Music video
 Glen Drover - guitars
 James MacDonough - bass
 Shawn Drover - drums

References

External links

Megadeth's official site

Megadeth songs
2004 singles
2004 songs
Songs written by Dave Mustaine